The Alabama Hills are a range of hills and rock formations near the eastern slope of the Sierra Nevada in the Owens Valley, west of Lone Pine in Inyo County, California.

Though geographically separate from the Sierra Nevada, they are part of the same geological formation.

Alabama Hills National Scenic Area  

Dedicated on May 24, 1969, the Alabama Hills were originally managed by the U.S. Bureau of Land Management (BLM) as the Alabama Hills Recreation Area. In March 2019, the U.S. congress redesignated the area as the Alabama Hills National Scenic Area as part of the John D. Dingell Jr. Conservation, Management, and Recreation Act.

Dispersed camping  

The Alabama Hills location as a gateway to Mt. Whitney and the Eastern Sierra Nevada Mountains has made dispersed camping very popular with the overlanding and RV communities. The region's fragile ecosystem and increasing numbers of visitors to Alabama Hills has prompted the Bureau of Land Management in its most recent guide to the area to discourage this practice asking visitors to, "Camp in campgrounds. Using campgrounds reduces the number of vehicles so that the great views are not blocked. Use the restroom in town or at nearby campgrounds. If that isn’t an option, bury human waste in catholes 6 inches deep and 200 feet away from water, trails, and camp. There are no restrooms in the hills...Camping in campgrounds helps maintain the area’s great scenery and recreational opportunities. City of Los Angeles Department of Water and Power lands in the area are open for day use only." Current fire and other restrictions can be found at the BLM's Alabama Hills NSA page.

Geology  

The rounded contours of the Alabamas contrast with the sharp ridges of the Sierra Nevada to the west. Though this might suggest that they formed from a different orogeny, the Alabamas are the same age as the Sierra Nevada. The difference in wear can be accounted for by different patterns of erosion.

There are two main types of rock exposed at Alabama Hills. One is an orange, drab weathered metamorphosed volcanic rock that is 150200 million years old. The other type of rock exposed here is 8285-million-year-old biotite monzogranite which weathers to potato-shaped large boulders, many of which stand on end due to spheroidal weathering acting on many nearly vertical joints in the rock.

Dozens of natural arches are among the main attractions at the Alabama Hills. They can be accessed by short hikes from the Whitney Portal Road, the Movie Flat Road and the Horseshoe Meadows Road. Among the notable features of the area are: Mobius Arch, Lathe Arch, the Eye of Alabama and Whitney Portal Arch.

History  

The Alabama Hills were named for the CSS Alabama, a Confederate warship deployed during the American Civil War. When news of the ship's exploits reached prospectors in California sympathetic to the Confederates, they named many mining claims after the ship, and the name came to be applied to the entire range. When the Alabama was finally sunk off the coast of Normandy by the USS Kearsarge in 1864, prospectors sympathetic to the Union named a mining district, a mountain pass, a mountain peak, and a town after the Kearsarge.

Filming location  

The Alabama Hills are a popular filming location for television and movie productions, especially Westerns set in an archetypical "rugged" environment. The first known movies to be filmed in the Alabama Hills are Water, Water Everywhere and Cupid, the Cowpuncher, both shot in 1919 and released in early 1920. These films are currently considered lost films. The oldest surviving film shot in the hills is The Round-Up (1920), starring Roscoe "Fatty" Arbuckle, which includes a cameo from his friend, Buster Keaton.  

Since then, hundreds of movies have been filmed there, including Gunga Din, Tremors, Iron Man, The Walking Hills, Yellow Sky, Springfield Rifle, The Violent Men, Bad Day at Black Rock, the Budd Boetticher/Randolph Scott "Ranown" cycle, How the West Was Won, Joe Kidd, Saboteur, and Django Unchained. Many episodes of various television shows have also been shot there, e.g. The Gene Autry Show, The Lone Ranger, Bonanza, and Annie Oakley. Nearly every major Western actor of the 1930s, '40s, and '50s rode their horses amid these rocks: John Wayne, Gregory Peck, Gary Cooper, Gene Autry, Tom Mix, Randolph Scott, Robert Mitchum, William Boyd, Roy Rogers, and many others. 

In Lone Pine, the closest town to the Alabama Hills, the Lone Pine Film History Museum explores the area's relationship to the art of cinema. Exhibits include the Dr. King Schultz dentist wagon from Django Unchained and the 1937 Plymouth Humphrey Bogart drove in High Sierra. Every Fall the Lone Pine Film History Museum hosts the Lone Pine Film Festival, which bills itself as "the only film festival on location," because festival-goers watch films shot in the area and then take tours into the Alabama Hills to see the very spots where the scenes they just watched were filmed.

Astronomy  

The Alabama Hills feature exceptional skies for Central California. It is Bortle class 2 or "average dark sky" site; this low level of light pollution meets or exceeds conditions in many of other popular nearby areas for amateur astronomy, such as Joshua Tree National Park (Bortle class 2–4). On a clear night with no moon, a visitor with good, dark-adapted vision may see the Andromeda and Triangulum galaxies with the unaided eye; the central Milky Way appears highly structured under these conditions.

References

Sources
Geology Underfoot in Death Valley and Owens Valley, Sharp, Glazner (Mountain Press Publishing Company, Missoula; 1997) .
Geologic map of the Lone Pine 15' quadrangle, Inyo County, California, scale 1:62,500, Stone, Paul, Dunne, G.C., Moore, J.G., and Smith, G.I., (U.S. Geological Survey Geologic Investigation Series I-26172000; 2000

External links

Alabama Hills Recreation Area website (BLM)
Films with shooting locations in the Alabama Hills (IMDb)

Hills of California
Rock formations of California
Landforms of Inyo County, California
Mountain ranges of the Mojave Desert
Climbing areas of California
Owens Valley
Bureau of Land Management areas in California